Raffaele Stancanelli (born 30 June 1950) is an Italian politician.

Biography 
After graduating in Law at the University of Catania, Stancanelli began his political career with the Italian Social Movement, being municipal councilor in Regalbuto from 1978 to 1983 and in Catania from 1985 to 1992.

In 1996, he is elected for the first time at the Sicilian Regional Assembly with National Alliance; he is re-elected in 2001 and becomes Councilor for Labor, Vocational Training, Social Security and Emigration, while in 2004 he became Councilor for the Family, Social Policies and Local Autonomies, both times as member of the junta of governor Salvatore Cuffaro. Elected once again in 2006, he became vicar vice-president of the Sicilian Regional Assembly.

At the Italian political elections of 2008, Stancanelli is elected Senator with The People of Freedom. A few weeks later, he is elected at the first round mayor of Catania, defeating among the others the candidate of The Right and former president of the province of Catania Nello Musumeci. In October 2011, after the Constitutional Court had ruled the obligation to opt between the office of mayor and the office of senator, Stancanelli resigned from the Senate.

In 2013, he failed to be re-elected mayor and is defeated by the centre-left candidate and former mayor Enzo Bianco.

After a short experience in Brothers of Italy, Stancanelli became one of the founders of Nello Musumeci's movement Diventerà Bellissima.

At the Italian political elections of 2018, Stancanelli returned to the Senate and joined the parliamentary group of Brothers of Italy.

In 2019 he has been elected MEP on the Brothers of Italy list.

References

External links 
Files about his parliamentary activities (in Italian): XVI, XVIII legislature.

1950 births
Living people
Italian Social Movement politicians
National Alliance (Italy) politicians
The People of Freedom politicians
Brothers of Italy politicians
21st-century Italian politicians
Mayors of Catania
MEPs for Italy 2019–2024
People from Regalbuto